Uchań Górny  ("Upper Uchań") is a village in the administrative district of Gmina Łyszkowice, within Łowicz County, Łódź Voivodeship, in central Poland.

The village has a population of 160.

References

Villages in Łowicz County